Plum Creek is a stream in the U.S. state of Minnesota. It is a tributary of the Big Fork River.

Plum Creek was named for the wild plum trees lining its banks.

See also
List of rivers of Minnesota

References

Rivers of Itasca County, Minnesota
Rivers of Koochiching County, Minnesota
Rivers of Minnesota